Mjällby is a locality situated in Sölvesborg Municipality, Blekinge County, Sweden with 1,254 inhabitants in 2010. It is located on the Listerlandet peninsula.

The town has traditionally lived of fishing. The nearby harbour of Nogersund is the third largest fishery harbour in Sweden. The fishery industry is also dominant on the peninsula. Listerlandet is also the fur farming centre of Sweden. Fur farming is currently under heavy political debate in Sweden.

Mjällby is known for its football team which has played in the Swedish national football league a few times. Among footballfans in Sweden the team of Mjällby AIF is known as "the team that always returns". In September 2009 the team once again qualified for the highest division and played five seasons in Allsvenskan before being relegated at the end of the 2014 season.

The mathematician Lars Hörmander was born in Mjällby.

A suburb of the town built by a local housing company was unofficially known for around 40 years by locals as Negerby (Negro village) because of the black chimneys on the houses. In 2012 the use of this name was reported by a journalist and following the public outcry the housing company decided to use the temporary name of Slottsstaden (Castle City).

References 

Populated places in Sölvesborg Municipality